This list of ancient Germanic peoples is an inventory of ancient Germanic cultures, tribal groupings and other alliances of Germanic tribes and civilisations in ancient times. The information comes from various ancient historical documents, beginning in the 2nd century BC and extending into late antiquity. By the Early Middle Ages, early forms of kingship began to have a historical impact across Europe, with the exception of Northern Europe, where the Vendel Period from AD 550 to 800 and the subsequent Viking Age until AD 1050 are still seen in the Germanic context.

The associations and locations of the numerous peoples and groups in ancient sources are often subject to heavy uncertainty and speculation, and classifications of ethnicity regarding a common culture or a temporary alliance of heterogeneous groups are disputed. Sometimes, it is uncertain that the groups are Germanic in the broader linguistic sense or, in other words, they consisted of speakers of a Germanic language.

In that respect, the names listed here are not terms for ethnic groups in any modern sense but the names of groups that were perceived in ancient and late antiquity as Germanic. It is essentially an inventory of peoples, groups, alliances and associations stretching from the Barbaricum region east of the Rhine to the north of the Danube (also known as Germania), especially those that arrived during the Migration Period.

In alphabetical order 

The present list is largely based on the list of Germanic tribal names and its spelling variants contained in the first register of the Reallexikons der Germanischen Altertumskunde.

The first column contains the English name and its variants, if one is common, otherwise the traditional ancient name. The second column contains ancient names of Latin and Greek authors, the latter both in transcription and in Greek. The third column gives a brief description followed by a location.

The fifth column gives important sources of tradition for the group in question. The few ancient main sources for names and location of Germanic tribes are not linked. These are:

Julius Caesar: Commentarii de Bello Gallico
Jordanes: De origine actibusque Getarum, short Getica
Ptolemy: Geography
Tacitus: Germania

Ancestors

Proto-Indo-Europeans (Proto-Indo-European speakers)
Proto-Germanics (Proto-Germanic speakers)

Possible ethnolinguistic kinship

East Germanic peoples (Vandilians) 

Avarpi
Burgundians / Burgundiones / Burgundes / Burgodiones (Frugundiones? may have been a variant of Burgundiones with the "B" as an "F" Furgundiones > Frugundiones) (Urugundes? may have been a variant of Burgundes without the initial "B" (B)urugundes > Urugundes, i.e. the Burgundians) (at the time of the Migration Period and Decline of the Roman Empire, they founded the Burgundian Kingdom) (Burgundians or part of them may have dwelt in Bornholm island for a time - old name of the island was Borgundarholm) (they were assimilated by the Gallo-Roman majority, however their ethnonym was the origin for the name of the region Burgundy - Bourgogne): Nibelungs (Old German) / Niflung (Old Norse), clan that was the Burgundian royal house known as Gibichungs (Old German) or Gjúkings (Old Norse)
Goths / Gothones / Gutones / Gautae / Geats
Gepids
Goths / Hreidgoths
Gothi Minores
Greuthungi (direct ancestors or an older name of the Ostrogoths)
Ostrogoths / Hreiðgoths (at the time of the Migration Period and Decline of the Roman Empire, they founded the Ostrogothic Kingdom in Pannonia, northern Illyria and Italia) (they were assimilated by the Italo-Roman majority)
Crimean Goths (existed as a people until 16th and 17th centuries in southern Crimea Peninsula or Taurida Peninsula) (they were later assimilated by Crimea Germans, Black Sea Germans, Crimean Greeks and Crimean Tatars)
Thervingi (direct ancestors or an older name of the Visigoths)
Visigoths (at the time of the Migration Period and Decline of the Roman Empire, they founded the Visigothic Kingdom in Southern Gaul and Hispania) (they were assimilated by the Hispano-Roman majority)
Herules, East Germanic (East Germanic Herules)
East Herules
West Herules
Lemovii (=Turcilingi?) (also probably identical with Widsith's Glommas, Glomma or Glomman was the singular form)
Lugians (Longiones?)  (=Vandals?)
Buri (Lugi Buri) (part of the Buri accompanied the Suebi in their invasion of Hispania, the Iberian Peninsula, and established themselves in a mountainous area of modern northern Portugal in the 5th century. They settled in the region between the rivers Cávado and Homem, in the area known as Terras de Bouro (Lands of the Buri) - Bouros = Buri - Buros in the masculine accusative Latin declension)
Diduni (Lugi Diduni) / Dunii / Duni (Δοῦνοι - Doūnoi was the Greek variant of the Latin name)
Harii
Helisii / Elysii / Helusii / Hellusii
Manimi / Omani? / Omanii? (Lugi Omani?) (the Omani may have been the same as the Manimi)
Marsigni
Vandals / Vandilii (at the time of the Migration Period and Decline of the Roman Empire, they migrated towards West allied with a Sarmatian Iranian people, the Alans, and founded the Vandalic Kingdom first in the Southern and Western regions of Hispania, Iberian Peninsula, the Hasdingi Vandals, settled in Gallaecia, the Silingi vandals settled in Baetica, roughly today's Andalusia; sometime after many left Hispania, and migrated to North Africa) (they were assimilated by the Hispano-Roman majority in Hispania, however their ethnonym was the origin for the name of the region Andalusia - (V)andalusia and for the Arabic name of Hispania and the Iberian Peninsula - Al-Andalus) (they were assimilated by the Berber majority and African-Romans in North Africa, including the Moors, in the narrow sense, the descendants of the Mauri)
Asdingi / Astingi / Hasdingi (Haddingjar?)
Helvecones / Helveconae / Aelvaeones / Elouaiones (possibly the Ilwan and Eolas of Widsith; Eolas was the nominative plural and Eolum the dative plural)
Lacringes / Lacringi
Nahanarvali
Silingi (same as the Nahanarvali?) (at one point they lived in Silesia, and the name of this region could be derived from their ethnonym as well as, although indirectly, Andalusia - (V)andal-usia, where Silingi Vandals initially settled in Hispania)
Victohali / Victuali / Victabali
Rugi / Rugii / / Ulmerugi / Variant Latin name for the Rugians: Rugiclei? / Greek names and variants for the Rugians: Rougíklioi / Routiklioi
Sciri
Angisciri 
Sulones (may have been the same as the Silingi)
Turcilingi / Torcolingi (may have been ancestors of part of the Thuringians)
Vidivarii
Visburgi / Visburgii

North Germanic peoples (Norsemen) 

East North Germanic (East Scandinavians)
Ahelmil
Aviones / Chaibones / Eowan (more probably they lived in Öland island, southeastern Sweden, and not in Jutland Peninsula)
Bergio
Brondingas / Brondingar (Brondings) (East North Germanic tribe that lived in the island of Brännö, west of Gothenburg in the Kattegatt)
Danes (Germanic tribe): Scyldingas (Skjöldungar) clan
Dauciones
Eunixi
Evagreotingis / Evagres
Favonae
Fervir (in Fyæræ)
Finnaithae (old name for Finnveden, the name derives from an old Germanic word for hunters - finn, they were not necessarily Finnic or Saami) (they lived in Finnveden, Western Småland)
Firaesi / Phiraisoi
Gevlegas / Gevlegar (Gefflegas / Gevlegs) (East North Germanic tribe that dwelt in today's Gävleborg County)
Goths, Scandinavian (Scandinavian Goths)
Geats / Gautigoths, Scandinavian (Scandinavian Gautigoths) / Gautae
Ostrogothae, Scandinavian (Scandinavian Ostrogoths): Wulfings / Ylfings clan
Gutes / Gotlanders / Vagoths / Valagoths
Hallin / Hilleviones? (possibly they lived in Halland and were the same as the tribe called Hallin by Jordanes)
Hälsingas / Hälsingar (Hälsings) (East North Germanic tribe that lived in Hälsingland)
Herules, Scandinavian (Scandinavian Herules / Erules)
Hocings (tribe or clan of Hnæf, son of Hoc Healfdene - Hoc, the Half Dane, mentioned by Widsith, may have been the same chieftain known as Haki by the Norsemen, mentioned in the Ynglinga Saga)
Levoni / Levonii
Liothida
Mixi
Njars
Otingis
Sitones
Suðrmenn (in Södermanland)
Suiones / Sviones / Suehans / Suetidi / Suetides (ancient Swedes) (Svíar): Wægmunding clan; Ynglings / Scylfings clan (Scylfingas / Skilfingar)
Västermännen (in Västmanland) (Svionic tribe that lived to the west of Uppland) (not to be confused with the Vestmenn - Old Norse word for the Gaels of Ireland and Britain)
Virdar (in Småland)
Theustes
Vinili / Winnili / Vinoviloth (Scandinavian Lombards or Longobards or Langobards): Hundingas / Hundings clan?
Normans - they were formed by the merger and assimilation of a North Germanic minority (that mainly came from Denmark - East North Germanics, but also Norway, and Iceland - West North Germanics) and Frankish (West Germanic) minority with a Gallo-Roman majority, ethnogenesis of the native people inhabiting Normandy, in France
West North Germanic (West Scandinavians)
Adogit / Halogit / Háleygir (they lived in Hålogaland) (northernmost Germanic tribe)
Aprochi
Arothi ("Arochi")
Augandii / Augandzi (Egðir) / Augandxii (in Agder, southern Norway)
Chaedini / Chaedenoi (possibly in Hedemark / Hedmark)
Doelir (possibly a tribe that lived inland, in the valleys of Dalen, Telemark, Tokke, Telemark, many of the counties were based on older tribal lands or territories)
Filir / Fjalir
Firdir (tribe that lived in today's Sogn og Fjordane county, Firdafylke was one of two historic counties, many of the counties were based on older tribal lands or territories)
Granni / Grenir
Haðar
Háleygir
Heinir / Heiðnir (Chaideinoi / Haednas) (in Hedmark, Norway)
Horðar (in Hordaland, known before as Hordafylke, many of the counties were based on older tribal lands or territories) (not originating from the Charudes/Harudes in Jutland)
Hringar (name means "rings", from hring - "ring")
Lidingar / Lidingas
Jamtr / Jamtar
Ragnaricii / Aeragnaricii
Rani / Ranii / Renir
Raumarici / Raumariciae / Raumar (Heatho-Reams of Widsith) (they lived in today's Romerike)
Rugi, Scandinavian (Scandinavian Rugi) / Rygir (Holmrygir of Widsith)
Taetel
Throwenas / Throwenar (Throwens of Widsith) (West North Germanic tribe that possibly dwelt in Trøndelag)
Wrosnas (mentioned by Widsith as a tribe ruled by Holen, possibly from Holen)
Old Faroese / Old Faroe Islanders (formed by the merger of several West North Germanic tribes with the addition of Celtic Gaels that settled in the Faroe islands)
Old Icelanders (formed by the merger of several West North Germanic tribes with the addition of Celtic Gaels that settled in Iceland) (they were organized in clans in the Icelandic Commonwealth - Icelandic clans: Ásbirningar; Haukdælir; Oddaverjar; Sturlungar; Svínfellingar; Vatnsfirðingar)
Greenland Norsemen (mainly descendants from Old Icelanders that settled  in Norse Greenland)
Vikings (in the Western Europe) / Varangians (in the Eastern Europe) (generic word for warriors, marauders and traders of Scandinavian or Norse i.e. North Germanic origin that went to or returned from other lands regardless of the tribe, they were not a specific Norse tribe or a Norse ethnic group, their arising in History is called Viking Age) (they contributed to the formation of the Rus’ people and Kievan Rus' loose federation that was ruled by the Varangian Rurik dynasty) / Ascomanni (name for the Vikings by Adam of Bremen)

West Germanic peoples 

Elbe Germanics (Herminones / Hermiones / Irminones)
Baemi-Baenochaemae
Baemi / Baimoi
Baenochaemae / Banochaemae
Bateinoi
Calucones (ancient Germanic tribe, not to be confuse with the Calucones, a Rhaetian tribe)
Caritni / Carini
Chatti-Mattiaci (originally they were an Elbe Germanic people later assimilated by the Istvaeones or Wesser-Rhine peoples, it was by the merger of the Istvaeones tribes with the Chatti and related tribes that the Franks were formed)
Chatti / Hatti (their ethnonym may have originated the name Hesse by phonetic change over time)
Mattiaci
Batavi-Cananefates
Batavi
Cananefates / Canninefates
Chasuarii / Hasuarii (closely related or not to the Chatti)
Chattuarii / Attoarii / Hattuarii / Hetware (possibly mentioned in Beowulf as Hetwaras) (they lived in Hettergouw or Hetter gouw) (closely related or not to the Chatti)
Chatvores
Cherusci (some were assimilated by the Mainland Saxons to the north)
Fosi
Marvingi / Marouingoi
Suebes / Suebi or Alemanni (synonymous with the Suebes in the broad sense) (large tribal confederation)
Brisgavi
Bucinobantes
Butones / Boutones
Corconti
Hermunduri               
Armalausi
Campi (tribe on the river Cham or Chamb, tributary of the Regen, close to Cham city)
Adrabaecampi / Campi 
Parmaecampi
Curiones
Danduti
Vangiones / Vargiones / Woingas (of Widsith)
Thuringians (Thuringii / Toringi) (formed by the merging of Hermunduri tribes, a tribal confederation part of the Elbe Germanic peoples) (some Turcilingi or Torcolingi were assimilated to the Thuringians) (some Thuringians joined the Longobardian migration towards south)
Graffelti (a late Thuringian tribe that lived in Grabfeld)
Lentienses
Lombards / Langobards / Longobards (Vinili) (Elbe Germanic Lombards) (they lived in Lüneburg Heath) (at the time of the Migration Period and Decline of the Roman Empire, they founded the Lombard Kingdom) (they were assimilated by the Italo-Roman majority, however their ethnonym was the origin for name of the region Lombardy - Lombardia)
Bardes
Heaðobards / Hadubardes / Heaðubeardan (Headubarden)
Marcomanni
Baiuvarii (Bavarians)
Mugilones
Nertereanes
Quadi / Coldui / Danube Suebi
Old Swabians (Danube Suebi that migrated westward) (they had a close relation with the Upper Rhine Alemanni and were descendants from common ancestors but they migrated in an East towards West migration route through the Danube from what is today's Moravia and from there from the Elbe basin in even older times, until they settled in Swabia) (ancestors of Swabian German speakers)
Suebi, Gallaecian (Gallaecian Suebi) (at the time of the Migration Period and Decline of the Roman Empire, they founded the Kingdom of the Suebi in Gallaecia, Northwestern Iberian Peninsula, roughly in today's Galicia, North Portugal and North Central Portugal, Asturias and León) (Suevos)
Racatriae / Racatae
Raetovari
Scotingi
Sedusii (a Germanic tribe that dwelled across the eastern region of the Rhine river and was part of the Suebic tribal confederation, mentioned by Julius Caesar)
Semnones
Iuthungi / Juthungi (descendants of the Semnones)
Sibini
Sidini
Suarines / Suardones (they may have lived in Schwerin region)
Suebi Nicrenses / Suebi, Neckar (Neckar Suebi) / Nictrenses / Upper Alemanni (Upper Rhine Alemanni, ancestors of Alemannic German speakers - Alemanni in the narrow sense) (they had a close relation with the Old Swabians and were descendants from common ancestors but they migrated in a direct North towards South migration route from the Elbe basin until they settled in Alemannia or Alamannia and Eastern Upper Burgundy, roughly in today's Western and Western Central Baden-Wurtenberg - Neckar river basin, Baden, Alsace, Lake Constance - Bodensee region, and Central Switzerland): Ahalolfings or Alaholfings
Sudini
Teuriochaemae / Teuriochaimai
Triboci
Varisti / Varisci / Narisci / Naristi
Victophalians / Victofalians / Victophali / Victofali
Zumi
Teutonari / Teutonoari
Varini / Warini / Auarinoi (may have been the same as the Varini, a variant name in Greek) / Viruni / Quirounoi? or Oúírounoi (possibly a mistaken transliteration of the Greek Ούίρουνοι = Oúírounoi - Viruni in Latin) / Warni / Viruni / Pharodini? / Farodini? (may have been the same as the Varini or Viruni)
North Sea Germanics (Ingaevones / Ingvaeones)
Ambrones (possibly the Imbers / Ymbers / Ymbrum of Widsith, tribe that dwelt in Jutland or in the Emmer (Ambriuna) river region; also they could have lived in the Island of Amrum, in the Atlantic coast, or in the island of Imbra, now known as Fehmarn, in the Baltic coast)
Ampsivarii / Amsivarii
Angles / Anglies
Island Angles / Insular Angles (in England they merged with Saxons and Jutes to form the new ethnolinguistic group of the Anglo-Saxons)
Mainland Angles / Continental Angles (later assimilated by the Danes in Angeln, Schleswig, North part of Schleswig-Holstein and by Frisians, North Frisians, in Southern Jutland Peninsula Atlantic coast and islands) (Aglies? a possible variant of the name Angles)
Anglevarii / Angrivarii (Angrarii / Angarii) (later assimilated by the Saxons)
Angrivarii (Angrarii / Angarii) (later assimilated by the Saxons)
Caulci (possibly a North Sea Germanic tribe mentioned by Strabo, he wrote that they lived close to the Ocean - the North Sea, they are mentioned along with North Sea Germanic tribes - Ingaevones)
Chali / Hallinger
Charudes / Harudes / Arochi
Chaubi (possibly a North Sea Germanic tribe mentioned by Strabo, he wrote that they lived close to the Ocean - the North Sea, they are mentioned along with North Sea Germanic tribes - Ingaevones)
Chauci
Chauci Maiores
Chauci Minores / Hugas (Saxon Hugas)
Cherusci (some were assimilated by the Mainland Saxons)
Cobandi
Cimbri / Cymbri
Dulgibini / Dulgubnii
Eudoses / Eutes / Euthiones (ancestors of the Jutes or a variant name of "Jutes"; Eutes > Iutes > Yutes > Jutes) (Endoses? possibly a variant of the name "Eudoses")
Jutes 
Island Jutes (in England they merged with the Angles and Saxons to form the new ethnolinguistic group of the Anglo-Saxons)
Mainland Jutes (later assimilated by the Danes in Jutland, today's Mainland Denmark)
Frisii
Frisiavones / Frisiabones (Frisii Minores)
Frisii (Frisii Maiores) (possible ancestors of the Frisians)
Old Frisians
Fundusi (a Germanic tribe that lived in Jutland)
Guiones (a tribe mentioned by the Massiliot Greek sea traveler and explorer Pytheas in his work - The Ocean that possibly lived in Jutland)
Hæleþan (Haelethan) (tribe that lived near the Randers Firth in North Jutland)
Nuithones / Nuitones
Sabalingioi / Sabalingi
Saxons (Old Saxons) 
Island Saxons / Insular Saxons (in England they merged with the Angles and Jutes to form the new ethnolinguistic group of the Anglo-Saxons)
Mainland Saxons / Continental Saxons (the variants Ga, Gao, Gau, Gabi, Go, Gowe, Gouw, Ge were the word for Gau - Old Saxon or Old Low German and Old High German term (in modern times Kreis) equivalent of the English Shire, regional administration, many times they matched a tribal land or territory, Old English had some traces, some Germanic cognates like Ga / Gа̄ or Ge, of this meaning which was ousted by Old English Scire - Shire, from an early time)
Agradingun (same as the Angrivarii or Angarii)
Myrgingas / Myrgings (tribe of Widsith, the wandering bard)
Later Saxons (after merger and assimilation of several North Sea Germanic and Elbe Germanic peoples and tribes)
Nordalbingi (Nordalbingians) / Nordliudi / Transalbingians (North of the Elbe, called before Alba or Albis river, in Holstein) (the original land of the Saxons) (their land included the Limes Saxonicus and the Danish March)
Holtsaetan / Holtsaeten / Holtsati / Holsatians / Holcetae (Holt Saetan - "Forest / Wood Settlement" or "Forest / Wood Settlers" - from which Holstein originate its name, and not from "Forest Stone") (a Nordalbingian tribe, North of the Elbe river,  part of the Saxon tribal confederation)
Thietmaresca / Thiadmariska / Men of Ditmarsch (in Dithmarschen)
Sturmarians (Sturmarii / Sturmera)
Bardi / Bardongavenses (they lived in Bardengawi / Barden gawi / Bardengau or Barden Gau)
Angarians / Angrians (same as the Angrivarii or Angarii) (in Angaria) (in the plain of Old Saxony south of the Elbe and along Weser river valley)
Agradingun / Agradine (lived in Agradingo / Agradingo go)
Almangas (they lived in Almango or Almango go)
Ammeri
Bursibani
Bucki
Dersi
Derve
Heilungun (they lived in Heilanga / Heilanga ga)
Hessi (in Hessa) (a North Hessian tribe assimilated by the Mainland Saxons)
Hlisgas (they lived in Hlisgo or Hlisgo go)
Hostingabi / Hostinga (they lived in Hostingabi / Hostinga gabi)
Huettas (they lived in Huettago or Huetta go)
Lagni
Lara
Lidbeke (they lived in Lidbekegowe or Lidbeke gowe)
Lohingi (they lived in Lohingao or Lohingi gao)
Moronas (they lived in Moronga or Moron ga)
Mosde 
Netga / Nete (they lived in Netga or Net ga)
Pathergi / Padergi (they lived in Patherga or Pather ga)
Sturmi
Tilithi
Waldseti / Waldseton
Wehsige (in Wehsigo or Wehsi go)
Wigmodia / Wihmodi (Bremon, today's Bremen was in their land)
Phalians (in Phalia) (in the plateau of Old Saxony)
Eastphalians (Ostfalahi) (in Eastphalia)
Derlinas (they lived in Derlingowe or Derlin Gowe - Derlingau or Derlin Gau)
Flutwide
Frisonovel
Gretingun / Gretingas (they lived in Gretinga / Gretinga ga)
Guottingi / Guddinges / Gotingi (a Gothic tribe that merged and assimilated to the Saxons) (they lived in Guotinga or Guotinga ga or Gotinga ga, Göttingen region)
Hartinas (lived in Hartingowe or Hartin gowe) 
Hasi (they lived in Hasigowe or Hasi gowe)
Hastfalon / Astfalon (they lived in Hastfalagowe or Hastfala gowe)
Maerstem
Nordsuavi (in Suavia) (a Northern Suebi / Suevi tribe that merged and assimilated to the Saxons)
Nortthuringun (a Northern Thuringian tribe that merged and assimilated to the Saxons) (lived in Nortthuringowe or Nort Thurin gowe)
Salthgas (they lived in Salthga or Salth ga)
Westphalians (Westfalahi / Westfali) (in Westphalia)
Angeron (they lived in Angeron)
Auas (they lived in Auga or Au ga)
Dreini (they lived in Dreini)
Grainas (they lived in Grainga or Grain ga)
Hama (a tribe descendant of the Chamavi / Hamavi, a Rhine-Weser Germanic tribe, one component of the Franks, that was later assimilated by the Mainland Saxons) (they lived in Hamaland or Hama land)
Hasi (they lived in Hasagowe)
Lerige (lived in Lerige or Leri ge)
Nihthersi
Scopingun
Sudergo (lived in Sudergo or Suder go)
Theotmalli
Threcwiti
Westfalon proper
Aringon 
Firihsetan / Virsedi 
Sahslingun
Scotelingun
Steoringun
Thiadmthora
Waledungun
Reudigni / Rendingi / Randingi / Rondingas / Rondings / Reudignes / Reudingi / Reudinges
Singulones / Sigulones
Sturii (a Germanic tribe that lived south of the Frisii)
Teutones (Teutons)
Anglo-Jutes-Saxons (Anglian-Jutish-Saxonian tribes, organized in Tribal Hidages, tribal lands) (new ethnolinguistic group formed by migration toward and settlement of Germanic tribes in Britannia, today's England, and also by assimilation of the conquered British Celts)
Angles (Island Angles)
Northumbrians (North of the Humber estuary)
Amoþingas / Amothingas (Emmotland in Yorkshire, anciently Aet Eamotum, perhaps also Amotherley, also in Yorkshire)
Beodarsæte (Anglian tribe that lived in Sunderland region)
Elmedsætan / Elmetsaete (Elmet)
Loidis (Anglian tribe that lived in Leeds region)
Southumbrians (South of the Humber estuary)
East Angles / East Anglians (in East Anglia)
Herstingas (Anglian tribe that lived in Cambridge region)
Ikelgas (Anglian tribe that lived in Icklingham region)
Norfolk (Anglian tribe - "North folk" of East Anglia that lived in Norfolk region)
Suffolk (Anglian tribe - "South folk" of East Anglia that lived in Suffolk region)
Middle Angles / Midlanders (in Mercia, roughly today's Midlands)
East Middle Angles / Middle Angles Proper (roughly in today's Cambridgeshire, Bedfordshire, Hertfordshire, Buckinghamshire and South Oxfordshire)
Bilmingas / Bilmigas (part of south Lincolnshire)
Cilternsæte / Cilternsætan (Settlers of Chiltern Hills – Middle Anglian tribe or clan)
Dornwaras (Settlers of river Dorn – Middle Anglian tribe or clan)
Færpingas / Feppingas / Faerpinga in Middelenglum (Charlbury and near Thame)
Giflas / Gifle (River Ivel, near Bedford)
Gyrwas / Gyrwe (Angle tribe or clan that dwelt in the fen) (in the Fens) (near Peterborough region)
North Gyrwas / North Gyrwe
Suth Gyrwas / Suth Gyrwe
Elge (Anglian tribe that lived in Elge - Isle of Ely)
Hiccas / Hicce (around today's Hitchin)
Hurstingas (River Ivel, near Bedford)
Spaldas / Spaldingas (Anglian tribe that lived in Spalding region)
Sweordoras (Whittlesey Mere)
Wideringas (near Stamford)
Wigestas
Willas / Wille
East Willas / East Wille
West Willas / West Wille
Wixnas
East Wixnas
West Wixnas
Lindisfaras (Anglian tribe that lived in Lindisfarona Tribal Hidage, Lindsey and North Lincolnshire)
Gaininingas / Gaini (Gainsborough, Lincolnshire)
Lindisfarningas (an outlier tribe that lived in the Lindisfarne island and region in the Northumbrian coast)
Mercians / Mercians Proper (they founded the Kingdom of Mercia, with Mercian conquests of other Middle Angles in the 7th and 8th centuries AD, "Mercian" and "Middle Angles" became almost synonymal)
North Mercians (the Mercians dwelling north of the River Trent, roughly in today's East Staffordshire, Derbyshire and Nottinghamshire)
Reagesate (Anglian tribe that lived in Repton)
Snotingas (Anglian tribe that occupied the settlement of Snottengaham or Snodengaham - modern Nottingham, Nottinghamshire)
South Mercians (the Mercians dwelling south of the River Trent, roughly in today's South Staffordshire and North Warwickshire)
Beormingas (Anglian tribe that lived in Birmingham region)
Bilsaete (Bilston)
Pencersaete (Penkridge)
Tomsaete (Tamworth, Staffordshire)
Outer Mercians (an early phase of Mercian expansion, possibly 6th century AD, roughly in today's South Lincolnshire, Leicestershire, Rutland, Northamptonshire and North Oxfordshire)
Undalas (Anglian tribe that lived in Undaium region, modern-day Oundle, in Northamptonshire)
Wideriggas
Pecsæte / Pecsætan (Anglian tribe that lived in today's Peak District, roughly in North Derbyshire)
Herefinnas (Derbyshire)
Hwiccians / Hwincas (Hwicce) (roughly in today's Gloucestershire, Worcestershire and South Warwickshire)
Arosæte / Arosaetan (in and around today's Droitwich Spa, Arosætna Tribal Hidage) 
Duddensaete (Dudley)
Husmerae (Kidderminster)
Stoppingas (Anglian tribe that lived in Wootton Wawen and the valley of the River Alne in modern-day Warwickshire)
Weorgoran (Worcester)
Westernas
Magonsæte / Magonsætan (roughly in today's Herefordshire and South Shropshire)
Hahlsæte (Ludlow)
Temersæte (Hereford)
Wreocensæte (Wrekinsets) (Wrēocensǣte, Wrōcensǣte, Wrōcesǣte, Wōcensǣte, Wocansaete) (Anglian tribe that lived in Wocansaetna Tribal Hidage) (roughly in today's Northern Shropshire, Flintshire and Cheshire)
Meresæte (in and around Chester)
Rhiwsæte (in and around Wroxeter, Shropshire) 
Tribes of the Land Between Ribble and Mersey (Anglian tribes that lived in what is today's Merseyside, in the Mersey Valley Land, today's Manchester and Liverpool region - Greater Manchester, and in south of the Ribble Valley Land, today's South Lancashire, roughly today's Lancashire) (a disorganized region under Mercian control from the 7th century AD)
Jutes (Island Jutes)
Cantwara / Centingas (Kentish / Kentish Men, in Cantwarena Tribal Hidage, Kent)
Andredes Leag (Jute tribe that lived in Andredsley and Newenden region in Kent)
Boroware (Jute tribe that lived in Canterbury region)
Ceasterware (Jute tribe that lived in Rochester, Kent region) 
Eastorege (Jute tribe that lived in Sandwich, Kent region)
Limenwara
Merscware (Dwellers of Romney Marsh, Kent)
Wihtwara (Wight Islanders) (Wihtgara Tribal Hidage) (in the Isle of Wight)
Meonwara / Meonware / Meonsæte (south-east Hampshire and Southampton, mainly on the Meon valley)
Ytenesæte (Jute tribe that lived in what is today's New Forest)
Saxons (Island Saxons)
East Saxons (East Secsenas) (in Essex)
Brahhingas (Saxon tribe centred on the settlement of Braughing in modern-day Hertfordshire)
Dæningas / Daenningas / Deningei / Deningel
Gegingas
Haeringas
Haueringas (Saxon tribe or clan that lived in today's London Borough of Havering, East End, London)
Hroðingas
Tewingas
Tota
Waeclingas
Middle Saxons (in Middlesex, roughly in what is today's Greater London, Hertfordshire, Surrey)
Bedingas (Bedfordshire)
Geddingas-Gillingas-Mimmas
Geddingas 
Gillingas (Saxon tribe or clan that lived in today's Ealing, West End, London)
Mimmas 
Gumeningas (Saxon tribe or clan that lived in today's Harrow on the Hill, West End, London)
Hakas (Saxon tribe that lived in Hackney, London)
Noxgaga / Noxga gā (gā is cognate of Gau) (Berkshire / Thames Valley Saxons)
Æbbingas / Aebbingas (Abingdon)
Braccingas (Bracknell)
Readingas (Reading)
Sunningas (Sonning)
Woccingas (Wokingham)
Padendene (Saxon tribe or clan that lived in Pæding-tun, modern-day Paddington, London)
Suther-ge (ge is cognate of Gau) (Surrey)
Ælffingas (Effingham)
Godhelmingas (Godalming)
Ohtgaga / Ohtga gā (Somewhere in Surrey)
Totingas (Tooting)
Wochingas (Woking)
South Saxons (South Saxons') (Sussex)
Haestingas (Hastings)
West Saxons (in Wessex)
Basingas (Basingstoke)
Eorlingas (Arlingham)
Glasteningas / Glestingas (Glastonbury)
Dornsaete / Dorsætan (Dorset)
Gewisse (Dorchester on Thames)
Hendricas (Wiltshire or Test Valley)
Sumortūnsǣte / Sumorsǣte / Sumorsætan (Somerset)
Unecunga / Unecung (they lived in Unecunga Ga - Unecunga Gau or Land, in the Upper Thames region)
Wilsætan (Wiltshire)
Wesser-Rhine Germanics (Istvaeones)
Baetasii / Betasii
Bructeri / Bructeres / Bructuarii / Borthari? (a possible changed name of Bructeri)
Chamavi / Hamavi (they lived in the region today called Hamaland, in the Gelderland province of the Netherlands, between the IJssel and Ems rivers)
Cugerni
Falchovarii
Gamabrivii / Gambrivii
Incriones
Landoudioi / Landi
Sicambri / Sigambres / Sugambri
Marsi
Marsaci / Marsacii
Salii / Salians (before formation of the Franks) (originally they only inhabited the northern Low Rhine area, in Salland) (later, those that stayed in Salland, were conquered and assimilated by the Saxons)
Sunici / Sunuci
Tencteri (etymology of the tribe's name is Celtic)
Tubantes / Tuihanti
Ubii
Usipetes / Usipii / Vispi (etymology of the tribe's name is Celtic)
Franks / Hugones (formed by the merging of Wesser-Rhine Germanic tribes - Istvaeones tribes and by the merging and assimilation of the Chatti and related tribes) (at the time of the Migration Period and Decline of the Roman Empire, they founded the Frankish Kingdom) (those living in what is today's West Central Germany and the Low Countries, mainly Ripuarian Franks, are the ancestors of the Franconian Germans (traditionally they spoke Franconian languages) and many of the Dutch, those living in what is today's France, mainly Salian Franks, were assimilated by the Gallo-Roman majority, however their ethnonym was the origin for another ethnonym "French" of the French people)
Ripuarian Franks (originally Rhine river banks Franks, Eastern Austrasia Franks, Rhineland Franks in Rhineland, Hesse, Palatinate and also in Upper Franconia, that before was Thuringian)
Hessian Franks / Hessians
Lognai (late Frankish tribe that lived in Lahngau, west of Taunus Mountains)
Moselle Franks
Nistresi (Nister Franks? Diemel Franks?) (a late Frankish tribe)
Suduodi (late Frankish tribe)
Upper Franconia Franks (originally it was a Thuringian region before Frankish conquest)
Wedrecii (late Frankish tribe that lived in around Wetter river or Wetterau, east of the Taunus Mountains)
Salian Franks (originally they inhabited the northern Low Rhine area, specifically today's Salland, later they expanded in the Low Countries, and most stayed there; even later, many migrated outside Eastern Austrasia, that included Rhineland, and beyond Silva Carbonaria and the Arduenna Silva, outside the original area of Frankish settlement where Gallo-Romans were the majority, scattered throughout the territory of the Kingdom of the Franks, roughly today's France, especially the northern regions, Western Austrasia and Neustria, they were later assimilated by the Gallo-Roman majority) (later, those that stayed in Salland, were conquered and assimilated by the Saxons)
Low Rhine Franks (Salian Franks that stayed in the Low Rhine region of Eastern Austrasia, later known as the Low Countries, ancestors of many of the Dutch and Flemish)
Western Austrasian Franks (in Western Austrasia, out of the Frank majority regions)
Neustrian Franks (in Neustria or Neustrasia, out of the Frank majority regions)

Germanic peoples or tribes of unknown ethnolinguistic kinship 
Eight tribes or peoples are only mentioned by the Old Mainland Saxon wandering bard, of the Myrgingas tribe, named Widsith - Aenenes; Baningas; Deanas (they are differentiated from the Danes); Frumtingas; Herefaran; Hronas or Hronan; Mofdingas and Sycgas (not to be confused with Secgan, short name for the work in Old English called On the Resting-Places of the Saints about saints' resting places in England).

Ancient peoples with partially Germanic background

Germano-Celtic 
Norse-Gaels (Austmenn - "Eastmen" - "People of the East", people who had come from the East - Scandinavia; Gaels of Ireland, Scotland and the Isle of Man were called Vestmenn - "Westmen" - "People of the West" - British Islands) (people of mixed Gaelic and Norse ancestry and culture that was formed in the Viking Age)
Norn people (Norðr - People of the North Islands)
Shetlanders (Hjaltar)
Orcadians
Sodor people (Hebridians-Manese Norse-Gaels) (Sodor - People of the South Islands)
Hebridians Norse-Gaels
Outer Hebridians Norse-Gaels
Inner Hebridians Norse-Gaels
Man Norse-Gaels
Ireland Norse-Gaels
Dublin Norse-Gaels
Wexford Norse-Gaels
Waterford Norse-Gaels
Cork Norse-Gaels
Limerick Norse-Gaels

Germano-Slavic 
Osterwalde (a Mainland Saxon tribe living in the same land and in close contact with the Drevani = "Wood" or "Wood Tribe", the Lipani and the Belesem or Byelozem = "White Earth" or "White Earth Tribe" Slavic tribes of the Obodrite confederacy that lived scattered in the west banks of the Elbe river, part of the Polabian Slavs or Elbe Slavs, West Slavs) (they lived in Oster Walde / Osterwalde - "Eastern Woods" in the Old Mainland Saxon view) (Osterwalde and Luneburg Heath also matched the land where the Langobards lived for a time before most of them migrated towards South) (mostly in today's Lower Saxony, in the Hanoverian Wendland, Germany)
Rus’ people, of Kievan Rus', loose federation that was ruled by the Varangian Rurik dynasty (they were formed by a mainly East Norse or East North Germanic minority, the Varangians, that came from coastal eastern Sweden or coastal Svealand, around the 8th century AD, from Roslagen in Sweden or Roden, that was assimilated by the East Slavic majority)

Ancient peoples of uncertain origin with possible Germanic or partially Germanic background

Mixed peoples that had some Germanic component

Celtic-Germanic-Iranian 
Bastarnae, an ancient people who between 200 BC and 300 AD inhabited the region between the Carpathian Mountains and the river Dnieper, to the north and east of ancient Dacia, possibly they were originally a Celtic tribe later mixed with Germanics and Sarmatians (a group of ancient Iranian peoples) - one possible origin of the name is from Avestan and Old Persian cognate bast- "bound, tied; slave" (cf. Ossetic bættən "bind", bast "bound") and Proto-Iranian *arna- "offspring")
Atmoni / Atmoli
Peucini / Peucini Bastarnae (a branch of the Bastarnae that lived in the region north of the Danube Delta) (Peucmi? possibly a variant of the name "Peucini")
Sidoni

Possible Germanic or non-Germanic peoples

Germanic or Slavic 
Vistula Veneti / Venedi (more probably a Balto-Slavic people)

Germanic or Celtic 
Anartes (more probably a Celtic tribe later assimilated by Dacians)
Campsiani (originally Celtic, assimilated by Germanics)
Cotini / Gotini (more probably a Celtic tribe)
Daliterni, their name was based on a river called Dala in older times (early name of the Veragri, a probable Gallic tribe located in present-day Switzerland, in the Valais canton, however there is the possibility, according to Livy, that they were a half Germanic tribe)
Germani Cisrhenani / Tungri? (a collective name for 7 tribes) (names' etymologies of many of the tribes were Celtic; Belgic people? Chiefs anthroponyms were also Celtic)
Aduatuci / Atuatuci
Ambivaretes / Ambivareti
Caemani / Paemani
Caeraesi / Caeroesi / Caerosi
Condrusi
Eburones (later Toxandri / Texuandri?)
Segni
Graioceli (more probably a Celtic tribe)
Maeatae / Maiates / Maiatae / Maiati / Miathi (probably a Southern Pictish tribal confederation beyond and north the Antonine Wall that lived in the land between the Firth of Forth and the Firth of Tay or parts of what is now Clackmannanshire, Fife and Stirlingshire and also in the Isle of May from the 2nd century AD to the 6th and 7th centuries AD; there is also the possibility, although weaker, that they were of Norse origin)
Nemeti / Nemetes / Nemetai (Νεμῆται) (more probably a Celtic tribe by its name Etymology, Toponyms and Theonyms)
Nervii (more probably a Belgic tribal confederation)
Treveri (more probably a Belgic tribe)
Tylangii (more probably a Celtic tribe related to the Tulingi or descendant from them)

Germanic or Dacian 
Carpi / Carpiani (more probably a Dacian tribe)

Germanic or Iranian 
Taifals (possibly they were a Sarmatian Iranian people assimilated by the Goths, before the Goths settled in what is today the steppe area of Ukraine, including Crimea, in the 2nd century AD, this area was inhabited by the Sarmatians)

Germanic or Balto-Finnic 
Idumingas / Idumings (more probably a Livonian tribe, called Ydumaei by Henricus Lettus or Henricus de Lettis or Heinrich von Lettland, who wrote the Chronicon Livoniae or Livonian Chronicle of Henry)
Kvenir / Kvænir mentioned in Egils Saga / Kvanes / Cwenas mentioned by Ohthere (more probably they were the Kainulaiset, that dwelt in Kvenland, a probable reference to Saami peoples also called Scridefinnas / Screrefennae or speakers of a related Uralic language) (over time their name became confused with the Old Norse word kván or kvæn - "woman", genitive plural kvenna, and became mistakenly confused with the legendary Amazons, a mythical all-women tribe that had relations with the Gargareans, a mythical all-men tribe)

Mythical founders 

Many of the authors relating ethnic names of Germanic peoples speculated concerning their origin, from the earliest writers to approximately the Renaissance. One cross-cultural approach over this more than a millennium of historical speculation was to assign an eponymous ancestor of the same name as, or reconstructed from, the name of the people. For example, Hellen was the founder of the Hellenes.

Although some Enlightenment historians continued to repeat these ancient stories as though fact, today they are recognised as manifestly mythological. There was, for example, no Franko, or Francio, ancestor of the Franks. The convergence of data from history, linguistics and archaeology have made this conclusion inevitable. A list of the mythical founders of Germanic peoples follows.

Angul — Angles (the Kings of Mercia, according to the Anglo-Saxon Chronicle, other Anglo-Saxon dynasties are derived from other descendants of Woden)
Ask — Istvaeones
Aurvandil — Vandals
Burgundus — Burgundians (Historia Brittonum)
Dan — Danes (Chronicon Lethrense)
Francio — Franks (Liber Historiae Francorum)
Gothus — Goths/Geats/Gutes
Ingve — Ingvaeones, Ynglings
Irmin — Irminones
Mannus — Manni, or "men", a name fragment as in the later Alemanni (Germania)
Nór — Norwegians (Chronicon Lethrense)
Seaxnēat — Saxons

See also 

Germania
Germanic peoples
Norse clans
Sippe
Tribal Hidage
Widsith
Beowulf

Notes

References 
Thorsten Andersson: Altgermanische Ethnika. In: Namn och bygd. Tidskrift för nordisk ortnamnsforskning. 97 (2009), pp. 5–39 (PDF; 9.7 MB; total year).
Otto Bremer: Ethnographie der germanischen Stämme. In: Hermann Paul (editor): Grundriss der Germanischen Philologie. volume 2, part 1: Literaturgeschichte. 2nd, improved and enlarged edition. Karl Trübner Verlag, Strasbourg 1900, pp. 735–930.
Ernst Künzl: Die Germanen (= Theiss WissenKompakt). Konrad Theiss Verlag, Stuttgart 2008, .
Günter Neumann: Namenstudien zum Altgermanischen (= Reallexikon der Germanischen Altertumskunde – Ergänzungsbände. volume 59). Edited by Heinrich Hettrich, Astrid van Nahl. de Gruyter, Berlin/New York 2008, .
Rudolf Much: Die Germania des Tacitus. 3rd considerable adult edition. Edited by Wolfgang Lange in collaboration with Herbert Jankuhn and Hans Fromm. Universitätsverlag Winter, Heidelberg 1967, .
Rudolf Much: Deutsche Stammeskunde. 3rd verb edition. Scientific association. Publisher, Berlin/Leipzig 1920, ; outlook Verlag, Bremen 2015, .
Heinrich Beck et al. (editor): Reallexikon der Germanischen Altertumskunde. 2nd edition. de Gruyter, Berlin/New York 1972–2008.
Hermann Reichert: Lexikon der altgermanischen Namen. Publisher of the Austrian Academy of Sciences, Vienna 1987, .
Ludwig Rübekeil: Völkernamen Europas. In: Ernst Eichler et al. (editor): Namenforschung. Ein internationales Handbuch zur Onomastik. volume 2, de Gruyter, Berlin/New York 1996, pp. 1330–1343.
Moritz Schönfeld: Wörterbuch der altgermanischen Personen- und Völkernamen nach der Überlieferung des klassischen Altertums (= Germanische Bibliothek. department 1: Elementar- und Handbücher. series 4: Wörterbücher. volume 2). Universitätsverlag Winter, Heidelberg 1911, ; Reprints each as 2nd, unchanged edition: (= Germanische Bibliothek. series 3 [much 2]). Winter, Heidelberg 1965, ; Wissenschaftliche Buchgesellschaft, Darmstadt 1965, .
Ernst Schwarz: Germanische Stammeskunde (= Germanische Bibliothek. volume 5). Universitätsverlag Winter, Heidelberg 1956, ; reprint: VMA-Verlag, Wiesbaden 2009, .
Alexander Sitzmann, Friedrich E. Grünzweig: Altgermanische Ethnonyme. Ein Handbuch zu ihrer Etymologie. Using a bibliography by Robert Nedoma editor of Hermann Reichert (= Philologica Germanica. volume 29). Fassbaender, Vienna 2008, .
Reinhard Wenskus: Stammesbildung und Verfassung. Das Werden der frühmittelalterlichen gentes. 2nd, unchanged edition. Böhlau Verlag, Cologne/Vienna 1977, .

External links 
Germania of Tacitus
A speculative Findlay map of 1849
Strabo's work The Geography (Geographica). Book 7, Chapters 1 and 2, are about Germania.

 
Lists of ancient Indo-European peoples and tribes
Germanic